Horstmann is a surname. Notable people with the surname include:

August Friedrich Horstmann (1842–1929), German physical chemist
Carl Horstmann, 19th-century editor of The Early South-English Legendary
Cay Horstmann, author of several computer programming books and the creator of the Horstmann indent style
Dennis Horstmann (born 1980), German DJ and dance music artist known as Special D.
Dorothy M. Horstmann (1911–2001), American epidemiologist, virologist and pediatrician
Ignatius Frederick Horstmann (1840–1908), American Roman Catholic bishop
Kai Horstmann (born 1981), English rugby union player
Karl Horstmann (born 1967), American film director, writer and producer
Ken Horstmann (born 1971), American film and television director
Oscar Horstmann (1891–1977), American baseball player
Roy Horstmann (1910–1998), American football player
Sidney Horstmann (1881–1962), British automotive engineer and businessman
Ulrich Horstmann (born 1949), German literary scholar and writer

See also
Horstmann suspension, type of armoured fighting vehicle suspension
Horstmann Peak, mountain of Idaho, United States
Horstmann Cars, British car manufacturer

German-language surnames